Membou is a Bengali television soap opera that premiered on Star Jalsha on 19 September 2016. It is produced by Acropoliis Entertainment Pvt. Ltd. and it stars Vinita Chatterjee as main female protagonist, Sourav Chakraborty as main male protagonist, and Dulal Lahiri, Mithu Chakraborty and Nandini Chatterjee in supporting roles.

Plot

Carol, a young woman of foreign origin, comes to India in search of her roots. Sparks fly when she meets Koustav, an orthodox Bengali. Koustav and his grandfather, Shibnath, fly to Georgia to attend a conference, where he meets Carol. After that, Koustav accidentally meets Carol everywhere and circumstances lead them to fight every time. Carol comes to India, but falls in a trap set by Rajan and Raghav. Koustav rescues Carol from these situations and marries her, stunning his family members.

Cast
 Vinita Chatterjee as Carol Brown
 Sourav Chakrabarty as Koustov Lahiri/Gora
 Dulal Lahiri as Sibnath - Koustov's paternal grandfather
 Mithu Chakraborty as Sibnath's widowed younger sister
 Saptarshi Roy as Biresh, Koustov's father
 Kaushik Banerjee as Carol and Shree's father
Mallika Banerjee as Carol and Shree's mother
 Priyyam Chakraborty as Shree, Koustov's second wife, Carol's half sister
 Arindam Banerjee as Paresh, Koustov's younger paternal uncle
 Moyna Mukherjee as Paresh's wife, Koustov's younger paternal aunt
 Abhijit Debroy as Debesh, Koustov's youngest paternal uncle
 Arpita Mukherjee as Debesh's wife, Koustov's youngest paternal aunt
 Mallika Majumder as Pishimoni, Sibnath's only daughter
 Anirban Guha as Sibnath's son-in-law
 Dhrubojyoti Sarkar/Dhrubo Sarkar  as Raghav Lunia
 Deerghoi Paul as Titli, Paresh's daughter, Zico's wife, Koustov's one-sided lover
 Suman Dey as Zico
 Upanita Banerjee as Shampa
 Unknown as Paresh's son, Titli's elder brother, Shampa's husband
Alokananda Roy as Sibnath's wife, Koustov's peternal grandmother
 Nandini Chatterjee as Koustov's mother, Biresh's wife, Carol's Mother-in-Law

References 

2016 Indian television series debuts
2017 Indian television series endings
Star Jalsha original programming